The Fainting Club is a members-only supper club for women, founded in 2014 by artist Zoe Crosher.  Described as an "old boys' club, for girls", it celebrates and draws creative women from multiple disciplines—artists, writers, filmmakers, chefs, musicians—and welcomes any and all like-minded souls.

Started in Los Angeles and based on the belief that strong, interesting and intelligent women are more powerful as a group, the club has begun to expand internationally. It now has chapters worldwide including in New York, Mexico City, London, Berlin, Paris and Hong Kong. All new members must be invited in person or, if distance prevents this, verbally, as connection and conversation are key to the club's purpose. The only requirement for joining is a generous, collaborative spirit and a willingness to support other women.

See also
 List of supper clubs

References

Dining clubs
Women-only spaces
Supper clubs
History of women in California
2014 establishments in California
2010s in Los Angeles